Ricardo Antonio Chavira (born September 1, 1971) is an American actor. He is best known for his role as Carlos Solis in the ABC television series Desperate Housewives (2004–2012). He also played Abraham Quintanilla in the Netflix original series Selena: The Series (2020).

Early life
Chavira was born in Austin, Texas, the son of a Bexar County judge, Juan Antonio Chavira. Raised in San Antonio, he graduated from Robert E. Lee High School and the University of the Incarnate Word. He is a '00 UC San Diego Alumnus and received his Master of Fine Arts in Acting from the University of California San Diego's graduate acting program in 2000, and moved to Los Angeles shortly thereafter. Since then, he has worked in film, television and theatre.

Career
Chavira began his career playing guest-starring roles on television shows, include NYPD Blue, 24, The Division, Joan of Arcadia and JAG. In 2002, he had a recurring role in the HBO comedy-drama Six Feet Under and was series regular on the unaired Fox sitcom The Grubbs. In 2004, he made his big screen debut appearing in a supporting role playing private José Gregorio Esparza in the western film The Alamo (2004).

In 2004, Chavira was cast as Carlos Solis, the husband of Eva Longoria’s character, Gabrielle Solis, in the ABC comedy-drama series Desperate Housewives. The series was a breakthrough hit for ABC receiving wide coverage. In 2005, Chavira listed on the "50 Most Beautiful" list in People en Español, and the following year named one of "TV's Sexiest Men" by TV Guide. Along with cast, he received two Screen Actors Guild Award for Outstanding Performance by an Ensemble in a Comedy Series in 2005 and 2006, and well as three ALMA Awards nominations for Outstanding Actor in a Comedy Series. The series ended in 2012 after eight seasons.

Chavira starred in a production of Tracers at the Odyssey Theatre in Los Angeles, and also starred in a co-production of Living Out. He played Stanley Kowalski in the Guthrie Theater's production of Tennessee Williams' A Streetcar Named Desire, from July 3 to August 21 of 2010 in Minneapolis. He also had voice roles as Alejandro Borges in the film Dead Space: Aftermath and as John Carver in the video game Dead Space 3. He also appeared in a number of movies, including Days of Wrath (2008), Saving God (2008), and Piranha 3D (2010). Along with the cast, Chavira won Audie Awards for Audiobook of the Year and Multi-Voiced Performance in 2010 for Nelson Mandela's Favorite African Folktales

Following Desperate Housewives, Chavira guest-starred on two episodes of USA Network drama series, Burn Notice in 2013, playing crime leader Rafael Serrano. Later that year, he went to star in the NBC sitcom Welcome to the Family. The series was canceled after three episodes. In 2015, Chavira guest starred on Castle episode "At Close Range", and in 2016 reunited with Eva Longoria in her short-lived sitcom Telenovela.

From 2016 to 2017, Chavira had a major recurring role in the ABC political thriller Scandal during the fifth and sixth seasons as democratic Governor Francisco “Frankie” Vargas who runs for president. At the same time, he had a recurring role in The CW comedy series, Jane the Virgin during the third season as Bruce, Xiomara's (Andrea Navedo) lover. In 2017, Chavira also had a recurring role in the Netflix  horror-comedy Santa Clarita Diet alongside Timothy Olyphant and Drew Barrymore. In 2020, Chavira was cast as Abraham Quintanilla, the father of late singer Selena in the Netflix limited biographical series, Selena.  He was a guest star on Chicago P.D. (S9:E6) in 2021.

Filmography

Films

Television

Theatre

Personal life
Chavira is a supporter of breast cancer research as his mother, Elizabeth Ries Chavira, died of breast and ovarian cancer when she was 43 years old. Chavira is San Antonio's honorary spokesman for the charity Susan G. Komen for the Cure, and last June served as the National Team Captain for the Race for the Cure in Washington, D.C. Chavira and James Denton were the 2005 spokespeople for the Lee National Denim Day breast cancer fundraiser.

He has been married to Marcea Dietzel since September 22, 2007. They have two children, a son, Tomás Antonio (b. January 8th, 2003) and a daughter, Belén Elysabeth (b. July 28th 2008).

In May 2011, Chavira was arrested for driving under the influence.

In October 2019, Chavira talked on Twitter about the relatively light prison sentence that his former Desperate Housewives castmate Felicity Huffman received for her role in the 2019 college admissions bribery scandal, citing "White Privilege."

References

External links
 

1971 births
American male film actors
American male stage actors
American male television actors
Living people
American male actors of Mexican descent
Male actors from Austin, Texas
Male actors from San Antonio
University of California, San Diego alumni
University of the Incarnate Word alumni
Hispanic and Latino American male actors
20th-century American male actors
21st-century American male actors